Brachichila is a genus of beetles in the family Carabidae, containing the following species:

 Brachichila fischeri Kirschenhofer, 1994
 Brachichila hypocrita Chaudoir, 1869
 Brachichila maculata Kirschenhofer, 1996
 Brachichila malickyi Kirschenhofer, 1996
 Brachichila midas Kirschenhofer, 1994
 Brachichila rugulipennis Bates, 1892
 Brachichila sabahensis Kirschenhofer, 2010
 Brachichila vietnamensis Kirschenhofer, 1996

References

Lebiinae